Typhoon Forrest, known in the Philippines as Typhoon Ising was the fastest-intensifying tropical cyclone on record, with its minimum barometric pressure dropping  from September 22 to September 23, in less than a day. Forrest formed from a tropical disturbance far from land in the western Pacific Ocean. On September 20, the system was classified as a tropical storm, and thereafter began to intensify. The next day, Forrest reached typhoon status, and the intensification process accelerated. Thereafter, Forrest began to weaken slowly as it moved northwest. Approaching Japan, Super Typhoon Forrest first hit Okinawa on September 27. Nearby, a tornado hit Inza Island, destroying 26 homes and injuring 26 people. Forrest then moved north, impaling the Japanese archipelago before transitioning into an extratropical cyclone on September 28, before eventually dissipating on October 4. The torrential rainfall caused by the typhoon triggered deadly landslides and flooding across Japan. In all, the typhoon killed at least 21 people, left 17 listed as missing, and injured 86. Forrest flooded 46,000 homes in muddy water, over 100 dwellings were destroyed, and 2,560 people were rendered as homeless. Seven flights were called off and 27,000 people were stranded. In addition, 67 bridges and 818 roads were damaged.

Meteorological history 

Initially, the system was not well-organized; however, it had a sufficient amount of convection. Hurricane hunters investigated the system four times from September 17–20, though none of them were able to identify a closed atmospheric circulation. Despite this, a Tropical Cyclone Formation Alert (TCFA) was issued on September 18. This alert was issued again on September 19; meanwhile, the Japan Meteorological Agency (JMA) started to monitor the system. By early on September 20, the JMA upgraded the system into a tropical storm as it moved west-northwest. During the evening hours of September 20, the JTWC started issuing warnings on the system after the low developed a central dense overcast. Based on this, the JTWC classified the system as a tropical storm and named it Forrest. Around this time, JMA upgraded Forrest into a severe tropical storm.

By 1800 UTC that day, both the JTWC and the JMA upgraded Forrest to typhoon status as the storm developed an eye. This marked the end of the fastest pressure drop ever recorded by a tropical cyclone— in just under 24 hours. By this time, the temperature within the eye, as recorded by Hurricane Hunter aircraft, had reached .

After attaining peak intensity, the storm weakened slightly on September 24 according to the JMA, though the storm briefly restrengthened to its peak wind speed at noon on September 25. By this time, Forrest was moving northwest, and the JTWC expected the storm to re-curve due to a weak spot in the subtropical ridge. However, the re-curvature took longer than expected. On September 27, however, the JMA estimated that Forrest finally began to weaken. The storm quickly weakened thereafter, and by midday, the JMA downgraded the system into a severe tropical storm. During September 28, the system completed its extratropical transition, with the JTWC issuing their final advisory on the system early on the next day. After becoming an extratropical cyclone the system recurved and started to accelerate towards the east-northeast, before the JMA stopped monitoring the system during September 30, as it moved into the East Pacific basin. Thereafter, several ships reported storm and gale force winds while the system moved towards the east-northeast as it apprpoached southwest Alaska.

Preparations and impact
Rainfall was light, totaling , but was enough to result in slight flooding.

A few people were hurt due to high winds, but according to the JTWC, the residents of Okinwana weathered the storm "well". Numerous funnel clouds were spotted, but no tornadoes were recorded. Throughout the island of Okinawa, 30 sustained minor injuries and 20 homes would either damaged or destroyed, including seven homes that were destroyed. About 160,000 customers lost power.

When the storm posed a threat to Kyushu, five ships were evacuated to an air force base that was considered "safe typhoon haven" by the JTWC. In Nagoya, five children were washed away by rising floodwaters while they were walking home from school. Four of the children were confirmed dead, and one 5-year-old child was reported missing. In Nishinomiya, near the western city of Kyoto, twelve construction workers were swept away by a downpour-triggered mudslide. Four of the construction workers were rescued, but the remaining eight of the construction workers were missing. Elsewhere in the city, a landslide destroyed two homes, resulting in the deaths of a 71-year-old and a 77-year-old farmer. In Hyogo, on Honshu, 12 people were buried alive when a hut collapsed due to a mudslide.

In all, Forrest killed at least 21 people, left 17 missing, and injured 86. Due to overflowing rivers and dikes, 46,000 houses were flooded, including 141 "seriously". Around 7,700 homes were under water, and over 100 were destroyed. In addition, 67 bridges and 818 roads were damaged. A total of 2,560 people were homeless. Seven flights were called off and 27,000 air travelers were stranded. Train service was halted for hours and track lines were damaged in eight places.

See also 

Typhoon Sanba (2012)
Typhoon Nepartak (2016)
Typhoon Hagibis
Hurricane Wilma – an Atlantic hurricane that underwent similar rapid intensification.
Hurricane Patricia – a Pacific hurricane that underwent similar explosive intensification.

Notes

References

External links 
Digital Typhoon tracking

1983 Pacific typhoon season
Typhoons
Typhoons in Japan
1983 in Japan
Forrest